Mai Thi Nguyen-Kim (born 7 August 1987) is a German chemist, science communicator, television presenter and YouTuber. In June 2020 she was elected to the senate of the Max Planck Society.

Life and education 

Nguyen-Kim was born in 1987 in Heppenheim, Hesse; her parents are from South Vietnam, her father is also a chemist. She studied at the Johannes Gutenberg University Mainz and Massachusetts Institute of Technology. She worked on her doctorate at RWTH Aachen University, Harvard University, and the University of Potsdam; completing it in 2017. She rejected a job offer from BASF to focus on science communication. She is married and has a daughter born in January 2020.

Career 

Nguyen-Kim started the YouTube channel The Secret Life Of Scientists in 2015. She began another channel, maiLab (originally named schönschlau), which is funded by German public broadcasters ARD and ZDF and as of September 2020 has over 1 million subscribers, in 2016.

She published popular videos about the COVID-19 pandemic on maiLab which made it into German YouTube trends and reached several million viewers within a short time.

She also contributed a widely noticed commentary on this topic in the German news programme Tagesthemen (ARD) and was invited as an expert in various talk shows.

On German television, Nguyen-Kim presents the science show  (WDR Fernsehen) since 2018, alongside . With Harald Lesch and  she presents the online video series .

Since October 2021, she presents a TV show called MAITHINK X – Die Show on ZDFneo.

Her book Komisch, alles chemisch published in March 2019 has been on the Spiegel bestseller list since November 2019.

Awards 

 Grimme Online Award (2018)
 Georg von Holtzbrinck Prize for Science Journalism (2018)
 German Web Video Award (2018)
  Journalist of the Year (2018)
 Hanns Joachim Friedrichs Award (2019)
 Federal Cross of Merit (2020)
 Heinz Oberhummer Award for Science Communication (2020)
 Grimme-Preis (2021) for journalistic contributions on COVID-19

Publications

References

External links 

 
 
 
 

1987 births
Living people
People from Bergstraße (district)
Johannes Gutenberg University Mainz alumni
Massachusetts Institute of Technology alumni
RWTH Aachen University alumni
Harvard University alumni
University of Potsdam alumni
German people of Vietnamese descent
21st-century German women scientists
21st-century German chemists
German television journalists
German women television journalists
German YouTubers
ZDF people
Recipients of the Cross of the Order of Merit of the Federal Republic of Germany